Valentina Magaletti is a multi-genre drummer, percussionist, improviser and composer based in London.

Biography 
Magaletti was born in Bari, Italy. She lives in London, UK.

Career 
She has collaborated and performed with London experimental electronic project Raime (with whom they form the band Moin), Charles Hayward, Nicolas Jaar, Jandek, Helm, Malcolm Catto, Lafawndah, Bat for Lashes, and Gruff Rhys (Super Furry Animals). Her influences include Ikue Mori, Georgia Hubley, Jaki Liebezeit, Milford Graves, Elvin Jones, Tony Buck, Charles Hayward, Billy Higgins, Han Bennink, and Art Blakey.

Her principal project was as one half of the duo Tomaga with bassist/multi-instrumentalist Tom Relleen. She is also a member of Moin and of the  experimental pop quintet Vanishing Twin and the supergroup UUUU, along with Graham Lewis (Wire) and Thighpaulsandra (Coil). In 2017, she played drums as part of surviving Can member Irmin Schmidt's The Can Project, based around Schmidt's orchestral reimagining of classic Can songs and themes with an ensemble. She and percussionist and sculptor Joăo Pais Filipe released their first album as CZN (Copper, Zinc and Nickel) The Golden Path in 2018, and a collaborative release with Swiss percussionist and composer Julian Sartorius, Sulla Pelle, followed in 2019.

References

External links 
 Futura Artists page

Musicians from London
Women drummers
20th-century drummers
Living people
Italian experimental musicians
Italian drummers
People from Bari
Year of birth missing (living people)